August Adolph von Hennings (19 July 1746, Pinneberg – 17 May 1826, Rantzau) was a politician, publicist and writer of the Age of Enlightenment, born into a Schleswig-Holstein family of lawyers. Active in Denmark and the German states, he was known as the "true apostle of the Enlightenment to the dukedoms" His elder sister Sophia (1742–1817) married the physician Johann Albert Heinrich Reimarus.

References

1746 births
1826 deaths
18th-century Danish politicians
Danish male writers